Grace Hartman may refer to:

 Grace Hartman (politician) (1900–1998), first female mayor of Sudbury, Ontario (and one of the earliest in all of Canada)
 Grace Hartman (trade unionist) (1918–1993), former president of the Canadian Union of Public Employees and the first woman to lead a major labour union in North America
 Grace Hartman (actress) (1907–1955), 1940s Broadway actress